Karan B Oberoi is an Indian singer, anchor and television actor. He is known for being a part of an Indipop boy band, A Band Of Boys, formed in 2001 and for playing the role of Raghav in Jassi Jaisi Koi Nahin (2003–06). The band was formed along with  Sudhanshu Pandey, Sherrin Varghese, Siddharth Haldipur and Chaitnya Bhosale. The band released a film, Kiss Kisko in 2004.

Career

Oberoi first started acting through the TV serial, Swabhimaan an afternoon soap opera aired in 1995, directed by Mahesh Bhatt, followed by Saaya in 1998.
He also played the role of Rajive in Dishayen.

He is a member of A Band of Boys, which was formed in 2001, after auditions which had 1200 entries, judged by Hariharan, Lesle Lewis, Vinod Nair and Manu Kumaaran. The band made their debut with album Kabhi yeh kabhi woh featuring the number Meri neend. The band did a movie titled Kiss Kisko in 2004.

Oberoi appeared in Jassi Jaissi Koi Nahin. He was also in serials such as Zindagi Badal Sakta Hai Hadsaa in which he played the role of Inspector Abhimanyu Singh/Abhi. He was also the anchor and host of Antakhshari in zee tv.

He was in a brief relationship with TV actress Mona Singh, after they met in 2006.

Filmography
 Kiss Kisko (2004)

TV Shows
 Swabhimaan (1995) as Bobby
 Aahat (1996-1997) as Inspector (ep 48-49), Insp. Arjun (ep 110-111)
 Saaya (1998) as Karan
 Milan (2000)
 Dishayen (2001–2003) as Rajiv
 Jassi Jaissi Koi Nahin (2005–2006) as Raghav Oberoi
 Titan Antakshari (Host)
 The Great Indian Comedy Show  (2004) as (Host)
 Zindagi Badal Sakta Hai Hadsaa (2008) as Inspector Abhimanyu Singh
 Inside Edge (2017)

References

External links
 
 

Indian male soap opera actors
Living people
Indian television presenters
Indian male pop singers
Indian male playback singers
1978 births